"My Life as a Turkey" is a television episode that premiered in 2011 in the UK on BBC (season 30 of the series Natural World, August 1) and in the US on PBS (season 30 of the series Nature, November 16). It won an Emmy Award for Outstanding Nature Programming. It was based on the book Illumination in the Flatwoods by Joe Hutto, who also co-wrote and hosted the TV program.

Synopsis
My Life as a Turkey describes how Hutto raised a brood of wild turkeys. They imprinted on him as they came out of the egg. He then led them on walks through the Florida woods. He describes how he learned their language and was impressed by their instincts and native intelligence. Eventually, after about a year, they became independent of him. The film shows footage of turkeys at all these ages, and is a re-enactment of the material described in Hutto's book.

Reception & media coverage
In relation to the film, Joe Hutto has been profiled in newspapers, with a focus on the program and book. The book was mentioned in The New Yorker.

Meaningful Quotes

“Their language and their understanding of the ecology shows a remarkable intelligence. But their ability to understand the world goes much further than just communication.  I came to realize that these young turkeys in many ways were more conscious than I was.  I actually felt a sort of embarrassment when I was in their presence - they were so in the moment - and ultimately their experience of that manifested in a kind of joy that I don’t experience and I was very envious of that.
I was learning new things about turkeys everyday.  But this was not just about how they live their lives - these animals were showing me how to live my life also.
We do not have a privileged access to reality.
So many of us live either in the past or in the future - and betray the moment.  And in some sense we forget to live our lives - and the wild turkeys were aways reminding me to live my life.
I think as humans we have this peculiar predisposition to be always thinking ahead - living a little bit in the future - anticipating the next minute, the next hour, the next day - and we betray the moment.   Wild turkeys don’t do that.   They are convinced that everything that they need, all their needs, will be met only in the present moment and in this space.  The world is not better half mile through the woods, it’s not better an hour from now, and it’s not better tomorrow - that this is as good as it gets.  So they constantly reminded me to do better, and to not live in this abstraction of the future, which by definition will never exist.  And so we sort of betray our lives in the moment and the wild turkeys reminded me to be present, to be here.”

"I learned many things - but maybe the most important was that we are essentially unaware of the overwhelming complexity that exists all around us. And I’ll never see the world in the same way again."

Awards
Emmy - Outstanding Nature Programming (2012)
Jackson Hole Wildlife Film Festival - Best Writing (2011)

References

External links
 
 My Life as a Turkey (viewable at Daily Motion)
 My Life as a Turkey (viewable online at PBS)
 My Life as a Turkey (clips online at BBC)

Animals and humans
Emmy Award-winning episodes
Documentary films about nature
Documentary films about birds
Documentary films about Florida
Birds of the United States